M-12 is a former state highway in the Upper Peninsula of Michigan. It was replaced in 1926 by:
U.S. Highway 2 in Michigan (US 2) between the state line at Ironwood and Crystal Falls
M-69 between Crystal Falls and Sagola
M-45 between Sagola and Iron Mountain (now M-95)
US 2 between Iron Mountain and Sault Ste. Marie

Since 1926, M-12 north of the St. Ignace area has been replaced by:
Business Loop Interstate 75 through St. Ignace
County Road H-63 to the Rogers Park area
M-134 to Cedarville
M-129 to Sault Ste. Marie
Business Spur Interstate 75 in Sault Ste. Marie

References

012
Transportation in Gogebic County, Michigan
Transportation in Iron County, Michigan
Transportation in Dickinson County, Michigan
Transportation in Menominee County, Michigan
Transportation in Delta County, Michigan
Transportation in Schoolcraft County, Michigan
Transportation in Mackinac County, Michigan
Transportation in Chippewa County, Michigan